Elizabeth Hoffman Is an American character actress. She is best known for her regular role as Beatrice Reed Ventnor, Swoosie Kurtz', Sela Ward's, Patricia Kalember's and Julianne Phillips' characters' mother, on the NBC drama series Sisters (1991–1996).

Biography
Hoffman was born in Corvallis, Oregon. She first appeared on television in a recurring role on Little House on the Prairie (1980–1981) before making her feature film debut in Frank LaLoggia's supernatural horror film Fear No Evil (1981), being cast in the leading role. In 1983, Hoffman portrayed Eleanor Roosevelt in Dan Curtis's historical miniseries The Winds of War. She had a supporting role opposite Barbra Streisand in the drama Nuts (1987), and subsequently reprised her role as Eleanor Roosevelt in the miniseries War and Remembrance in 1988.

Hoffman next appeared in Monte Hellman's horror film Silent Night, Deadly Night 3: Better Watch Out! (1989). From 1991 to 1996, she portrayed Beatrice Reed Ventnor, Swoosie Kurtz', Sela Ward's, Patricia Kalember's and Julianne Phillips' characters' mother, on the drama series Sisters.

Hoffman also guest-starred in a number of television shows and mini-series such as Little House on the Prairie, War and Remembrance, Matlock and thirtysomething, and well as several movies including playing the role of Grandma Ruth in Dante's Peak. She also played the role of Catherine Langford in Stargate SG-1.

Filmography

Film

Television

References

External links

Actresses from Oregon
American film actresses
American television actresses
Living people
People from Corvallis, Oregon
21st-century American women
Year of birth missing (living people)